Siglingasamband Íslands is the governing body for watersports in Iceland. It encompasses the following Federations.

 Icelandic Sailing Association
 Icelandic Rowing Association
 Icelandic Canoeing Association

External links

Sports governing bodies in Iceland
Water sports in Iceland